Clive Alfred Fergie (20 December 1895 – 13 August 1960) was an Australian rules footballer who played with Fitzroy in the Victorian Football League (VFL).

Fergie played his early football at Scotch College before starting his league career in 1915. After appearing in the opening three rounds of the 1916 VFL season, he embarked for Europe to serve with the 3rd Machine Gun Battalion in the war and would fight on the Western Front. He was awarded both a British War Medal and Victory Medal for his war service.

He returned to Australia in 1919 and played seven games for Fitzroy that year. In 1922 he was Fitzroy's first rover in their premiership side and also played in their team which lost the 1923 VFL Grand Final.

References

1895 births
Australian rules footballers from Melbourne
Fitzroy Football Club players
Fitzroy Football Club Premiership players
Australian military personnel of World War I
1960 deaths
People educated at Scotch College, Melbourne
One-time VFL/AFL Premiership players
People from Williamstown, Victoria
Military personnel from Melbourne